Live Oak is a historic plantation house and site built between 1800 and 1816, and located in Weyanoke, Louisiana, United States. It was listed on the National Register of Historic Places since in 1977, due to its architectural significance. Live Oak is one of the earliest houses in Feliciana Parish and reflects the Anglo-American influence of the late eighteenth and early nineteenth centuries. The plantation was built by Elijah Adams but the exact construction date is unknown. The plantation is now owned by Victor F. "Trey" Trahan III, FAIA.

See also 

 National Register of Historic Places listings in West Feliciana Parish, Louisiana
List of plantations in Louisiana

References

External links

Houses on the National Register of Historic Places in Louisiana
Houses completed in 1800
Houses in West Feliciana Parish, Louisiana
Plantations in Louisiana
National Register of Historic Places in West Feliciana Parish, Louisiana